Melchior Lechter (2 October 1865, Münster - 8 October 1937, Raron) was a German painter, graphic artist, and book designer.

Life and work 

He was born to Theodor Lechter (1825–1882), a merchant from Hamm, and his wife, Catharina née Terwort (1825–1883). As he appeared to have some artistic ability, at the age of fourteen he began training as a glass painter. After work, he took classes in drawing and painting at the artists' cooperative. His earliest influences came from the Nazarene painter, Joseph Anton Settegast, who worked at churches throughout that part of Germany. Upon completing his apprenticeship, in 1884, he went to Berlin, where he studied at the University of the Arts. He would be associated with the Academy for ten years.

He initially supported himself by producing practical art, such as advertising materials, until 1896, when the Fritz Gurlitt Gallery presented an exhibition of his serious works; including stained glass windows depicting Tristan and Isolde. The latter was destroyed during World War II. In 1898, the furniture manufacturer, commissioned windows and a mural for the Museum of Applied Arts in Cologne.    

His designs were awarded a major prize at the Exposition Universelle (1900). He later met the poet and translator, Stefan George, and would create numerous designs for his publisher, .  

In 1903, he completed what he considered his greatest work: the mural, commissioned in 1898, for what was by then known as Pallenberg Hall, at the Museum of Applied Arts. Called "" (Consecration at the Mystical Spring), it shows Stefan George "receiving the mystical source of potion", and symbolizes the "exaltation, liberation and perpetuation of man through art". Unfortunately, in 1943, the museum was bombed out by an Allied attack. In 1906, perhaps inspired by his research for the mural, he joined the Theosophical Society Adyar. Four years later, he visited their headquarters in India with the writer, Karl Wolfskehl. Upon their return, his diary, with illustrations, was published in a limited edition by his own Einhorn Press, which specialized in books about Stefan George, Christianity, and Indian philosophy.

In 1921, he visited the spa town of Bad Orb and, after many years without inspiration, had what he described as a "creative frenzy". He would become a frequent visitor and guest there throughout the twenties and early thirties, and a major contributor to the local culture; together with the composer, and the clergyman, who wrote three books about Bad Orb and its history that Lechter illustrated. 

He died in Switzerland, shortly after his 72nd birthday, while visiting the grave of Rainer Maria Rilke.

References

Further reading 
 Georg Fuchs: "Melchior Lechter", In: Deutsche Kunst und Dekoration 1 (1897–1898), pp.161–192 (UB Heidelberg).
 
 Jürgen Krause, Sebastian Schütze (Eds.): Melchior Lechters Gegen-Welten. Kunst um 1900 zwischen Münster, Indien und Berlin, Westphalian State Museum of Art and Cultural History, 2006, 
 Wolfhard Raub: Melchior Lechter als Buchkünstler. Darstellung, Werkverzeichnis, Bibliographie, Cologne: Greven, 1969
 Friedrich Wolters: Melchior Lechter. Hanfstaengel, Munich, 1911 (Online)

External links 

 More works by Lechter @ ArtNet
 
 Inventory of the Melchior Lechter Papers, 1879–1937 @ Online Archive of California
 Biographical timeline @ the Westphalian State Museum

1865 births
1937 deaths
19th-century German painters
19th-century male artists
German illustrators
German stained glass artists and manufacturers
Berlin University of the Arts alumni
German Theosophists
People from Münster
20th-century German painters
20th-century male artists